Dasineura pteridis is a species of fly in the family Cecidomyiidae. It is found in the  Palearctic .  The larvae gall Pteridium aquilinum.

References

External links 
Images representing  Cecidomyiidae at BOLD

Cecidomyiinae
Insects described in 1871
Nematoceran flies of Europe